Homecoming is a 1981 young adult novel by American children's author Cynthia Voigt. It is the first of seven novels in the Tillerman Cycle. It was adapted into a television film.

Plot introduction
Homecoming, set around the late 1970s, tells the story of four siblings aged between six and thirteen, whose mother abandons them one summer afternoon in their car next to a Connecticut shopping mall during an aborted road trip to a family member in Bridgeport. Realizing that their mother is not coming back, and that they cannot go home (as their father walked out before the youngest child was born), the children travel together, mostly on foot, trying to reach Bridgeport. There, they hope to find their missing mother at the home of a relative they have never met. The children find themselves on a journey that is emotional as well as literal; during their weeks on the road, their adventures and the people they meet along the way help them to find out more about who they are and what is important to them, as well as to cope with the loss of their mother and to understand society's reaction to her poverty, isolation, mental illness, and the fact that she was an unmarried mother of four.

Thirteen-year-old Dicey Tillerman, and her siblings James (10), Maybeth (9) and Sammy (6), lived in a wooden house out in the dunes in Provincetown, Massachusetts. The family is poor, their father walked out just before Sammy was born, and only Dicey retains any memory of him. Their mother worked herself too hard (physically and emotionally) to take care of her four children and make ends meet.

The novel begins when the Tillerman children find themselves alone in their car, some miles from their home, in a shopping mall parking lot in Peewauket, apparently Connecticut. Momma had driven them away from home, saying that they were going to visit her Aunt Cilla in Bridgeport, Connecticut. At the mall, she parked the car and walked away, instructing the children to do what Dicey told them.

After waiting for a few hours, Dicey begins to understand that Momma is not coming back. Worried that going to the authorities might place her siblings and herself in foster homes and split them up, Dicey decides that the four children must try to continue on to Aunt Cilla themselves, and that hopefully they will find their mother there.

The children set off on foot, as they do not have enough money for a bus. Dicey realizes that the journey is longer than she had initially thought it would be. She then takes charge of their meager finances, by earning money whenever necessary and possible. Dicey comes to understand more fully how difficult things must have been for Momma, and how she must have slowly lost hope (and eventually her sanity).

The children's journey is a long one. They are often hungry and sad and have some frightening brushes with danger. When their money runs out in the center of New Haven, Dicey makes James, Maybeth, and Sammy sleep under a bush in a park, while she watches over them. They are rescued by a college student, Windy, who feeds them and offers them shelter. The next day, Stewart, Windy's roommate, gives the children a ride to Bridgeport, dropping them off outside Aunt Cilla's house.

At Aunt Cilla's, Dicey and her family learn some uncomfortable truths: their mother is not there and Aunt Cilla is recently deceased. Her middle-aged, unmarried daughter Eunice, a devout Catholic, is reluctant to be burdened with the Tillerman children. She had plans to enter a convent and taking in the homeless children will put an end to her dreams of becoming a nun. The children are not Catholic, and their parents were unmarried, which Eunice does not like. Reluctantly, with the advice of a Catholic priest, she takes them in. The police try to trace the children's mother.

The younger children are put into a Catholic summer camp, while Dicey is made to stay home and help Eunice keep house. Sammy gets into fights and is unruly and difficult when at home. Maybeth is extremely shy and has learning difficulties. Cousin Eunice believes she is "retarded", and that Sammy is unmanageable. James becomes distant from his family.

The children are informed that their mother is completely catatonic in a Massachusetts state psychiatric hospital, without much chance of recovery. As a result, any dream they harbored of being reunited with Momma and starting a new life with her is shattered.

Dicey plans to leave Eunice's house alone, in search of a better home for her family with her grandmother, who lives in Crisfield, Maryland. Although she had only planned to visit her, the other Tillerman children sneak away from school to join her. The Tillerman family finds itself on the road again in search of a home; this ends the first part of the novel.

The second journey, like the first, is hard and fraught with danger. Attempting to earn money by picking tomatoes, the children find themselves nearly captured by their employer who has apparently taken an interest in Maybeth. In an attempt to escape, the children are helped by a traveling circus who drive the children to Crisfield.

Abigail Tillerman, the children's grandmother, lives alone on a run-down farm. She tells Dicey that the children cannot live there and that she can shelter them for only one night. However, Dicey realizes that the farm would be good for her family, and that they have nowhere else to go. She and her family try to win their grandmother over by doing work around the farm. Dicey learns that her grandmother is frightened of becoming emotionally attached to the Tillerman children, in case she were to lose them as she lost her own children. Mrs. Tillerman confesses to Dicey that she bears the pain of this, and fears repeating the same failures.

Eventually, Mrs. Tillerman comes to the realization that besides caring deeply for the four children, she can and will offer them a permanent home, despite the emotional and financial fears she has. The novel ends with Dicey feeling that she and her family have come home at last.

Characters
Dicey Tillerman is the novel's main protagonist. Dicey is a thirteen-year-old girl who is unconcerned with external appearances – her haircut and clothes make many people think she is a boy. Dicey has brown hair and hazel eyes.  She displays a fierce determination to survive and keep her family together. Dicey, as the oldest child of a mentally unwell single mother, is used to playing the role of an adult in her family, but when their mother abandons them, Dicey steps into greater responsibility than she ever had. Dicey is tough, pragmatic, and suspicious of anyone outside of the circle formed by her immediate family, only taking help from others when she absolutely needs to do so. She is willing to do everything within her power and take any risks necessary to protect her siblings and keep them together. 
James Tillerman is the next eldest child. At ten, he is a thinker rather than a doer, and a natural loner. He loves books and learning, and likes to think out the answers to difficult questions. James did well academically but did not have any friends at school. He respects those who he believes are intelligent, sometimes without questioning their morals. When he falls and hurts his head during an overnight stay in a park, he pretends to be more injured than he really is so that the family can stay a few more days in the company of teenage runaways Louis and Edie, because he believes Louis is smart, even though Louis is a thief and a nihilist. When Sammy starts to emulate Louis by stealing food for the family, James supports his act, quoting Louis by saying that everyone must look out for himself and the only certainty in life is death. Later in the novel, James steals money himself and only listens to the rational explanations of Stewart, the student from whom he stole.
Maybeth Tillerman is nine years old, and very pretty with blonde hair and a gentle, accommodating personality. She is extremely quiet and shy, and is thought to have learning difficulties, although the novel does not go into details about what these might be. We learn only that she has been kept behind a year at school, that she worried her teachers who sent many notes home to her mother. The notes went unanswered, and it is believed by Maybeth's teachers that she cannot read or do simple mathematics. In reality, although slow, she is just far too shy at school. She is scared and distrustful of others, apart from her family. Maybeth demonstrates mature, developed emotional perception and awareness, capable of seeing the real character of people. She is a talented singer and looks like Momma physically. Dicey and James are afraid that Maybeth may have inherited her mother's tendency to depression and insanity.
Samuel "Sammy" Tillerman is the youngest Tillerman. He is a robust child, who had problems with discipline at school, often getting into fights when the other children taunted him about his "crazy" mother, lack of a father, and his slow sister Maybeth. Sammy prefers physical activity to thinking out ideas, is brave and very loyal to his family. Of all the Tillermans, he is most affected by his mother's sudden disappearance and has difficulty in accepting that she is not going to come back to them. Sammy is capable of being recklessly happy, although the difficulties he has faced in his short life, and the trauma of losing his Momma, have dampened this side of his character. During the long journey, he is sometimes stubborn and sullen.  
Momma is Liza, the Tillermans' mother. Momma features in the story mainly via the reminiscences and thoughts of the four children and Gram – she only appears in the novel once, briefly, at the very beginning, when she says goodbye to her children before abandoning them in the car. According to Gram,  Momma was a gentle and quiet young woman who decided when she left home at the age of 21 never to marry, having learned from her parents that marriage leads to bitterness and lies. The images of Momma that are filtered through her children's and mother's memories paint a picture of a loving and beautiful woman, but one who is neither particularly reliable nor practical. There appears to have been an idealistic and almost reckless side to her character; she has four children by her itinerant, gambling boyfriend – with whom Dicey remembers her having "real fights", although the couple do not have the financial means or stability to bring them up. However, Momma truly does love all her children and gave them everything she had. When Momma becomes pregnant with Sammy, their fourth child, the children's father is angry about it and soon leaves her, (it is suggested) under legal duress as Dicey remembers a visit from the police following his absence. Momma struggles under the responsibility of raising her four children on her own, but eventually buckles under the pressure. Immediately prior to the events of the novel, Dicey recalls that Momma lost her job as a supermarket checker, and started to behave more and more erratically, going missing for hours on end and not speaking to the children.
Gram is Abigail Tillerman, the children's maternal grandmother, although Dicey and her siblings had never heard anything about her and she did not know of them either. The children hear about her first through Cousin Eunice in Bridgeport, where they learn that Gram is considered extremely eccentric, even crazy. When the children meet Gram for the first time, she is a widow, her husband John having died only a couple of years previously. Gram is enjoying her solitude and voluntary isolation after years of reining in her strong personality to accommodate her strict husband. Gram had always obeyed her husband even when she knew he was wrong. Her inflexibility, it is inferred, helped to drive away her three children, John (who is apparently a lawyer somewhere in California), Liza (the children's mother, who ran away from home and refused to marry the father of her children) and Samuel ("Bullet"), who was killed in Vietnam. Gram, like Dicey, is fiercely independent and at first is not ready to accept responsibility for her four abandoned grandchildren because she fears the emotional attachments that this will bring, and also that she will repeat the same mistakes she made with her own children.
Cousin Eunice is the only daughter of Aunt Cilla, their mother's cousin and niece to Gram. Eunice is unmarried and a pious Catholic, whose life is governed by routine and what she sees as her duty. Her greatest desire is to become a nun and enter a convent. Eunice is "silly", almost completely incapable of spontaneity and affection. While she does take in the Tillerman children, she does so from a sense of "duty" and expects the children to show gratitude and to earn their keep through good behaviour, and, in Dicey's case, through taking on nearly all of the household chores.

Minor characters

Windy and Stewart - two college students who shelter, feed and help the Tillerman family for one night in New Haven before Stewart drives the children to Bridgeport. Neither young man seems to care about what happens to them
Will Hawkins, the owner of a circus, and Claire, a dog trainer in the circus, who rescue and help the Tillermans, and who both return to see if the Tillerman children are all right at their grandmother's house.
Tom and Jerry, two boys who help them with crossing the ocean.
Edie and Louise, two teenagers whom they meet at the state park they stayed in for a few days.

Major themes
Belonging:  The theme of belonging runs throughout the whole book. The children search for a home, a physical place where they can belong. They search Toesses, they belong together. The children also struggle to see where they belong in the wider world, in society. The children have trouble belonging in schools, they each are different on whether they can stand their grounds.
Breaking societal conventions: This theme is strongly linked, and often inseparable from, that of Belonging. Because the Tillermans come from a non-traditional family (their parents remained unmarried, and their father left before the youngest child was born), they are to some degree on the margins of society. Dicey lies to the younger children, saying she remembers a wedding. At school, all the children are bullied because of their parentage: James and Dicey do not have friends, Sammy and Dicey get into fistfights. Cousin Eunice and her religious adviser similarly disapprove of their status and lack of religion: Dicey is told that she "must have another name". Gram is a woman who has deliberately removed herself from mainstream society, choosing to live alone and adopt "eccentric" behaviour, such as bare feet, and odd dress. Both Gram and (to a lesser extent) Dicey grow to realise that it is not possible to live in isolation. Gram accepts first her grandchildren and then the Welfare money necessary to help feed and clothe them. She takes charge of enrolling the children in local schools. Dicey accepts that she, too, will go to school and learn like a normal child. She learns at various points in the novel that she must accept outside help (just like her grandmother), or that she must rely on others rather than on just herself, if she is to survive. Yet, at many points in the novel, breaking conventions is shown to elicit personal growth, or at least to help the characters survive a difficult situation, whereas following convention is shown to inhibit growth and harm characters. By breaking gender roles, Dicey is able to escape authority and look after her family. However, by her rigid adherence to habit, Cousin Eunice (who wants to literally clothe herself in a nun's habit) is unable to properly love the children, bound as she is by her ideas of "duty" and of doing what she believes the world to expect of her. Gram, too, has harmed herself and those around her by adhering to convention and to "duty": by sticking by her rigid husband even when she knows in her heart he is wrong, she has destroyed her family.
The sea and sailing: All of the kids can swim, and love of the ocean is a defining trait of Dicey from the novel's start. As her thoughts develop on her journey, it's clear that sea/water journeying is her metaphor for life. In Part 2 of the book, the four Tillermans need to travel from Annapolis to Maryland's Eastern shore; two boys Tom and Jerry take them over on a sailboat, and this journey is pivotal for Dicey. Far from shore, when the wind is feeble, she is allowed to control the tiller, and at the trip's end, Jerry says "I've never seen anybody take to it like that" . In Dicey's Song, she is determined to fix an old boat she finds at Gram's farm, and continue to learn to sail. The family name, Tillerman also connects to the sailing theme. 
Family as home:  The children learn the importance of families throughout the novel. Their "Homecoming" is a journey that leads them to a long-lost grandmother, the mother of their beloved - and now lost - Momma, and a key to unlocking their family history. They start to learn that families can be fragile, and that if they are not nurtured and protected, they can fall apart as Gram's family has. This is a theme that is explored in much more depth in the next novel in the Tillerman Cycle, Dicey's Song.

Geography
In her Afterword to the novel, Voigt explains that although the Tillerman family and the events described are all fictional, the geography of the book is accurate. However, some of the places mentioned are either fictional or deliberately or unintentionally misnamed.

Peewauket, Connecticut: The town in which the children are abandoned. Although no place with this name exists, there is a town near Stonington, Connecticut, named Pawcatuck (pronounced Paw-kit-tuk, with the accent on the Paw), which is probably the place Voigt refers to.
Rockland State Park, Connecticut: There is a Rockland State Park, but it is ninety miles from the coast and so is not the shoreline park the children stay in for a few days after James hurts his head in a fall. This park is likely to be Rocky Neck State Park, which fits the description and location.
Landing Neck Road, Crisfield, Maryland: While Crisfield is a real town and the descriptions of it appear accurate, there is no Landing Neck Road, although there are run-down farms in the area described.

Homecoming in the Tillerman Cycle
This novel is the first in a seven-part series, known as the Tillerman Cycle. The novel introduces some of the main characters in the cycle, and refers to others, such as Bullet Tillerman and Francis Verricker. Apart from Dicey's Song, which describes events immediately following Homecoming, the Tillerman Cycle is not chronological. Each book in the series follows events in the lives of different characters introduced in Dicey's Song or Homecoming. Seventeen Against the Dealer takes up events in Dicey's life when she is 21. A Solitary Blue concerns events in the life of Jeff Greene, a character introduced in Dicey's Song and a central figure in Seventeen Against the Dealer. The Runner is about Samuel 'Bullet' Tillerman, the children's late uncle and Gram's son. Sons from Afar tells the story of James' and Sammy's search for the lost father, Francis Verricker. Come a Stranger describes events in the life of Mina, a character introduced in Dicey's Song.

Homecoming can be seen as the first in a two-part series, which forms the basis for the explorations of character that occur throughout the rest of the Tillerman Cycle.

Release details
1981, USA, Atheneum Publishers
1984, UK, Collins
1999, UK, Collins Modern Classics

1981 American novels
American young adult novels
Novels set in Connecticut
Novels set in Maryland
Culture of Bridgeport, Connecticut
Crisfield, Maryland
Novels set in Massachusetts
Provincetown, Massachusetts
Ballantine Books books
American novels adapted into films
American novels adapted into television shows
Atheneum Books books

References